The Ministry of Industrialisation and Trade (MIT) is a government ministry of Namibia, with headquarters in Windhoek.  It was created at Namibian independence in 1990 as Ministry of Trade and Industry, renamed Ministry of Industrialisation, Trade and SME Development in 2015, and got its current name in 2020. The first Namibian minister of trade was Ben Amathila. The  minister is Lucia Iipumbu.

Ministers
All trade and industry ministers in chronological order are:

See also
Economy of Namibia

References

External links
Official website Ministry of Industrialisation and Trade

Trade
Trade
Economy of Namibia
1990 establishments in Namibia